Vangino is a rural locality (a village) in Yugskoye Rural Settlement, Cherepovetsky District, Vologda Oblast, Russia. The population was 1 as of 2002. There are 3 streets.

Geography 
Vangino is located 25 km southeast of Cherepovets (the district's administrative centre) by road. Doronino is the nearest rural locality.

References 

Rural localities in Cherepovetsky District